The women's 100 metres hurdles at the 2017 Asian Athletics Championships was held on 8 July.

Medalists

Results

Heats
Qualification rule: First 3 in each heat (Q) and the next 2 fastest (q) qualified for the final.

Wind:Heat 1: +0.1 m/s, Heat 2: +0.8 m/s

Final

Wind: -0.1 m/s

References

100
Sprint hurdles at the Asian Athletics Championships